Seronggang is a village in the Tibet Autonomous Region, in China.

Populated places in Tibet
Lhünzhub County